Jennifer Rose Tate (born September 2, 1985) is an American female mixed martial artist. Tate started training in Taekwondo at the age of 13, and she earned her Black belt. She was the Northern California Golden Gloves champion in 2007 and 2008. She was also a contestant on the Muay Thai themed reality series Fight Girls. In episode five, Tate fought and loss to fellow housemate Miriam Nakamoto to a split decision. She fought in Thailand 4 times winning all four fights. Tate is 1-0 as a professional boxer. Tate is trained by Moses Cortes Stockton, California with boxing coach Richard Perez.

Early life
Tate was born in Lodi, California on September 2, 1985. She got involved with taekwondo during her teens and received a black belt.

Mixed martial arts career
Tate made her mixed martial arts debut on June 3, 2006 and submitted Tonya Evinger with a triangle choke in the second round. The fight was the first women's bout ever sanctioned by the California State Athletic Commission. She won the fight by triangle choke in the second round.

After two wins in the Global Knockout promotion, Tate submitted Angela Hayes with a first-round armbar at EFWC - The Untamed on October 6, 2007 in the first sanctioned women's bout in the city of Orange County, California.

On October 26, 2007, Tate made her ShoXC debut against and lost to Shayna Baszler by armbar in 44 seconds. Following the fight, Tate tested positive for marijuana. Tate was fined $500, before she was officially suspended for three months.

Tate returned to mixed martial arts competition at Pure Combat - Halloween Bash on November 1, 2008. She defeated Sarah Schneider by Split Decision.

On January 30, 2010, Tate entered the Freestyle Cage Fighting Women's Bantamweight Grand Prix at FCF 39 and submitted fellow EliteXC veteran Kaitlin Young with an armbar in the second round.

Tate withdrew from the FCF tournament on March 4, 2010 after announcing that she was pregnant with her second child.

Personal life
Tate's first son is named Richard. Tate had her second child with her boyfriend Moses, a son named Jacob, on October 29, 2010.

Mixed martial arts record

|-
| Win
| align=center| 6-1
| Kaitlin Young
| Submission (armbar)
| Freestyle Cage Fighting 39
| 
| align=center| 2
| align=center| 2:35
| Shawnee, Oklahoma, United States
| 
|-
| Win
| align=center| 5-1
| Sarah Schneider
| Decision (split)
| Pure Combat - Halloween Bash
| 
| align=center| 3
| align=center| 3:00
| Sacramento, California, United States
| 
|-
| Loss
| align=center| 4-1
| Shayna Baszler
| Submission (armbar)
| ShoXC: Elite Challenger Series
| 
| align=center| 1
| align=center| 0:44
| Santa Ynez, California, United States
| 
|-
| Win
| align=center| 4-0
| Angela Hayes
| Submission (armbar)
| EFWC - The Untamed
| 
| align=center| 1
| align=center| 1:08
| Anaheim, California, United States
| 
|-
| Win
| align=center| 3-0
| Kim Gibson
| KO (punches)
| Global Knockout 3
| 
| align=center| 1
| align=center| 0:07
| Jackson, California, United States
| 
|-
| Win
| align=center| 2-0
| Katrina Alendal
| Submission (rear-naked choke)
| Global Knockout 1
| 
| align=center| 1
| align=center| 4:58
| Jackson, California, United States
| 
|-
| Win
| align=center| 1-0
| Tonya Evinger
| Submission (triangle choke)
| IFC - Warriors Challenge 21
| 
| align=center| 2
| align=center| 1:56
| Tuolumne, California, United States
|

Bare knuckle record

|- 
|Lose
|align=center|0-1
|Christine Ferea
|TKO (Punches)
|BKFC 3: The Takeover
|
|align=center|1
|align=center|1:55
|Biloxi, Mississippi, USA
|

References

External links
 

1985 births
American female kickboxers
American female mixed martial artists
American Muay Thai practitioners
Female Muay Thai practitioners
American female taekwondo practitioners
American women boxers
American practitioners of Brazilian jiu-jitsu
Female Brazilian jiu-jitsu practitioners
Kickboxers from California
Living people
Mixed martial artists from California
Mixed martial artists utilizing Muay Thai
Mixed martial artists utilizing boxing
Mixed martial artists utilizing taekwondo
Mixed martial artists utilizing Brazilian jiu-jitsu
Bare-knuckle boxers 
Participants in American reality television series
People from Lodi, California
21st-century American women